Victor Oduro (born 25 April 2000) is a Ghanaian professional footballer who plays as a midfielder for Ghanaian Premier League side Dreams F.C.

Career 
Oduro started his career with Still Believe FC, the youth side of Ghanaian club Dreams FC. He was promoted from the youth academy into the senior side in 2019 ahead of the 2019–20 Ghana Premier League. He made his debut on 29 December 2020, playing the full 90 minutes in a 4–1 victory over King Faisal Babes. he made 9 league matches before the league was put on hold and later cancelled as a result of the COVID-19 pandemic. In October 2020, he along with 3 other players including Kingsley Owusu signed a new three-year deal to keep him at the club until 2023. He was named on the club's squad list for the 2020–21 Ghana Premier League season in the club's hope performing better than their subsequent seasons.

References

External links 

Living people
2000 births
Association football midfielders
Ghanaian footballers
Dreams F.C. (Ghana) players
Ghana Premier League players